The 2022–23 season is the 112nd in the history of FK Austria Wien and their 74th consecutive season in the top flight. The club are participating in the Austrian Football Bundesliga, the Austrian Cup, and the UEFA Europa League.

Players

Other players under contract

Transfers

Pre-season and friendlies

Competitions

Overall record

Austrian Football Bundesliga

League table

Results summary

Results by round

Matches 
The league fixtures were announced on 22 June 2022.

Austrian Cup

UEFA Europa League

Play-off round 
The draw for the play-off round was held on 2 August 2022.

UEFA Europa Conference League

Group stage 

The draw for the group stage was held on 26 August 2022.

References

FK Austria Wien seasons
Austria Wien